The 2014 Houston Cougars softball team represented the University of Houston in the 2014 NCAA Division I softball season.  Kyla Holas entered her 14th season as head coach of the Cougars. The Cougars were picked to finish 3rd in the AAC. The Cougars would finish fourth in the conference standings and be upset in the 1st Round of the AAC Tournament. However the Cougars would receive an at-large bid to the 2014 NCAA Tournament. After going 1-2 in the Waco Regional, the Cougars ended the season 33-23.

2014 Roster

Schedule 

|-
!colspan=10 style="background:#CC0000; color:#FFFFFF;"| Houston Hilton Plaza Classic

 

|-
!colspan=10 style="background:#CC0000; color:#FFFFFF;"| Houston Hilton Plaza Invitational

|-
!colspan=10 style="background:#CC0000; color:#FFFFFF;"| Easton Crimson Classic

|-
!colspan=10 style="background:#CC0000; color:#FFFFFF;"| Regular Season

|-
!colspan=10 style="background:#CC0000; color:#FFFFFF;"| Judi Garman Classic

|-
!colspan=10 style="background:#CC0000; color:#FFFFFF;"| Regular Season

|-
!colspan=10 style="background:#CC0000;"| 2014 AAC Tournament 

|-
!colspan=10 style="background:#CC0000;"| 2014 NCAA Regionals

References 

Houston
Houston Cougars softball seasons
Houston Cougars softball